The arrondissement of Die is an arrondissement in the Drôme department in the Auvergne-Rhône-Alpes region of France. It has 113 communes.

Composition

The communes (with their INSEE codes) of the arrondissement of Die are:

Allex (26006)
Ambonil (26007)
Aouste-sur-Sye (26011)
Arnayon (26012)
Aubenasson (26015)
Aucelon (26017)
Aurel (26019)
Autichamp (26021)
Barnave (26025)
Barsac (26027)
La Bâtie-des-Fonds (26030)
Beaufort-sur-Gervanne (26035)
Beaumont-en-Diois (26036)
Beaurières (26040)
Bellegarde-en-Diois (26047)
Boulc (26055)
Bouvante (26059)
Brette (26062)
Chabrillan (26065)
Le Chaffal (26066)
Chalancon (26067)
Chamaloc (26069)
La Chapelle-en-Vercors (26074)
La Chaudière (26090)
Charens (26076)
Chastel-Arnaud (26080)
Châtillon-en-Diois (26086)
Cliousclat (26097)
Cobonne (26098)
Crest (26108)
Die (26113)
Divajeu (26115)
Échevis (26117)
Espenel (26122)
Establet (26123)
Eurre (26125)
Eygluy-Escoulin (26128)
Félines-sur-Rimandoule (26134)
Francillon-sur-Roubion (26137)
Gigors-et-Lozeron (26141)
Glandage (26142)
Grane (26144)
Gumiane (26147)
Jonchères (26152)
Laval-d'Aix (26159)
Léoncel (26163)
Lesches-en-Diois (26164)
Livron-sur-Drôme (26165)
Loriol-sur-Drôme (26166)
Luc-en-Diois (26167)
Lus-la-Croix-Haute (26168)
Marignac-en-Diois (26175)
Menglon (26178)
Mirabel-et-Blacons (26183)
Mirmande (26185)
Miscon (26186)
Montclar-sur-Gervanne (26195)
Montlaur-en-Diois (26204)
Montmaur-en-Diois (26205)
Montoison (26208)
Mornans (26214)
La Motte-Chalancon (26215)
La Motte-Fanjas (26217)
Omblèze (26221)
Oriol-en-Royans (26223)
Pennes-le-Sec (26228)
Piégros-la-Clastre (26234)
Plan-de-Baix (26240)
Le Poët-Célard (26241)
Ponet-et-Saint-Auban (26246)
Pontaix (26248)
Poyols (26253)
Pradelle (26254)
Les Prés (26255)
Puy-Saint-Martin (26258)
Recoubeau-Jansac (26262)
La Répara-Auriples (26020)
Rimon-et-Savel (26266)
Rochechinard (26270)
Rochefourchat (26274)
La Roche-sur-Grane (26277)
Romeyer (26282)
Rottier (26283)
Saillans (26289)
Saint-Agnan-en-Vercors (26290)
Saint-Andéol (26291)
Saint-Benoit-en-Diois (26296)
Saint-Dizier-en-Diois (26300)
Sainte-Croix (26299)
Sainte-Eulalie-en-Royans (26302)
Saint-Jean-en-Royans (26307)
Saint-Julien-en-Quint (26308)
Saint-Julien-en-Vercors (26309)
Saint-Laurent-en-Royans (26311)
Saint-Martin-en-Vercors (26315)
Saint-Martin-le-Colonel (26316)
Saint-Nazaire-en-Royans (26320)
Saint-Nazaire-le-Désert (26321)
Saint-Roman (26327)
Saint-Sauveur-en-Diois (26328)
Saint-Thomas-en-Royans (26331)
Saou (26336)
Solaure-en-Diois (26001)
Soyans (26344)
Suze (26346)
Vachères-en-Quint (26359)
Valdrôme (26361)
Val-Maravel (26136)
Vassieux-en-Vercors (26364)
Vaunaveys-la-Rochette (26365)
Vercheny (26368)
Véronne (26371)
Volvent (26378)

History

The arrondissement of Die was created in 1800. At the January 2017 reorganisation of the arrondissements of Drôme, it gained 17 communes from the arrondissement of Valence, and it lost six communes to the arrondissement of Nyons and one commune to the arrondissement of Valence.

As a result of the reorganisation of the cantons of France which came into effect in 2015, the borders of the cantons are no longer related to the borders of the arrondissements. The cantons of the arrondissement of Die were, as of January 2015:

 Bourdeaux
 La Chapelle-en-Vercors
 Châtillon-en-Diois
 Crest-Nord
 Crest-Sud
 Die
 Luc-en-Diois
 La Motte-Chalancon
 Saillans

References

Die